George Frederick Abbott (28 October 1874 – 13 March 1947) was an English war correspondent and author and the husband of Wilhelmina Hay Abbott.

Life
Abbott was educated at Emmanuel College, Cambridge, taking the degree of B.A. in 1899.  In 1900 he was sent by Cambridge University to Macedonia to make studies in the folklore of that region. Sympathetic to the Greek cause, he stayed in Thessaloniki for some time, before visiting Serres, Sidirokastro, Drama and Meleniko. On his return trip he stayed in Kavala and toured Mount Athos. He acted as special correspondent in southwestern Europe for several London newspapers until 1903. In 1905 he accompanied the Prince of Wales (later on, George V), on his tour of India.

For his contribution to Greek causes, he was awarded the decoration of Commander of the Order of the Redeemer by the Greek state. He was married to 'Elizabeth' Wilhelmina Hay Lamond (1884–1957), an equalitarian feminist campaigner, and they had one son, Commander (E) Jasper A.R. Abbott, OBE, RN (1911–1960).

His works include a study on Greek songs, a collection of folkloric material from the region of Macedonia, a treatise on Thucydides and a book on the relations between Greece and the Allies.

Works
Besides contributing articles to many reviews and magazines, he wrote:  
 Songs of Modern Greece (1900)
 Macedonian Folk-Lore (1903)
 The Tale of a Tour in Macedonia (1903)
 Through India with the Prince (1906)
 Israel in Europe (editor, 1907)
 Greece in Evolution (1909)
 Turkey in Transition (1909)
 The Philosophy of a Don (1911)
 The Holy War in Tripoli (1912)
 Greece and the Allies (1914–1922)
 ''Under the Turk in Constantinople (1920)

References

External links
 
 
 

English male journalists
20th-century travel writers
English travel writers
English political writers
English non-fiction writers
1874 births
1947 deaths
Alumni of Emmanuel College, Cambridge
English male non-fiction writers
English social commentators
English folklorists
British expatriates in the Ottoman Empire